Stanisław Grzepski (1524–1570) was a Polish Humanist mathematician.
Bibliografia polska (in Polish)

1524 births
1570 deaths
Polish mathematicians